Marko Macan (born 26 April 1993) is a Croatian water polo player. He was part of the Croatian team at the 2016 Summer Olympics, where the team won the silver medal.

See also
 List of Olympic medalists in water polo (men)
 List of world champions in men's water polo
 List of World Aquatics Championships medalists in water polo

References

External links
 

1993 births
Living people
Sportspeople from Dubrovnik
Croatian male water polo players
Water polo centre backs
Water polo players at the 2016 Summer Olympics
Medalists at the 2016 Summer Olympics
Olympic silver medalists for Croatia in water polo
World Aquatics Championships medalists in water polo
Water polo players at the 2020 Summer Olympics